All Day, All Night is the second studio album by American R&B duo Changing Faces. It was released by Big Beat and Atlantic Records on June 10, 1997, in the United States. The album was released after multiple soundtrack appearances by the group, including A Low Down Dirty Shame (1994), White Man's Burden (1995) and High School High (1996) and Space Jam (1996). All Day, All Night features the singles "G.H.E.T.T.O.U.T.," "All of My Days," and "I Got Somebody Else," the latter of which was featured on the High School High soundtrack. The album was certified gold by July 1997, having sold over 500,000 copies in the US alone.

Critical reception

MacKenzie Wilson from Allmusic found that All Day, All Night "finds the group working a musical territory similar to their debut, namely smooth urban R&B with light hip-hop influences. Although the group's material is wildly uneven, the production is stylish and their vocals are strong, making the weak moments tolerable and the best songs quite attractive."

Track listing

Charts

Weekly charts

Year-end charts

Certifications

References

1997 albums
Big Beat Records (American record label) albums
Changing Faces (group) albums